Newhaven (Newhaven II in England) was an Australian bred Thoroughbred racehorse who won the 1896 Victoria Derby and the 1896 Melbourne Cup carrying a record weight for a 3 year old of 7st.13lb by 6 lengths.

Marius Sestier filmed Lady Brassey placing the Blue Ribbon on Newhaven when Newhaven won the Victoria Derby.

Sestier filmed Newhaven winning the 1896 Melbourne Cup, the first time the cup was filmed.

Newhaven finished his racing days in England as Newhaven II. He won 4 races including the rich City and Suburban Handicap and the Epsom Gold Cup. When retired to stud he was excluded from the studbook due to doubts about the breeding of his ancestor Musidora (2nd Melbourne Cup 1863).

References

External links
 Newhaven's pedigree Pedigree online Thoroughbred Database

1893 racehorse births
Melbourne Cup winners
Victoria Derby winners
Racehorses trained in Australia
Racehorses trained in the United Kingdom